Watcher or Watchers may refer to:

In print
 Watcher (angel) or Grigori, a class of fallen angels in Biblical apocrypha
 Watcher (comics), an extraterrestrial species who watches the universe in Marvel Comics
 Uatu, the Watcher
 The Watcher and Other Weird Stories, a collection of short stories by Sheridan Le Fanu
 The Watcher, a 1981 novel written by Kay Nolte Smith
 Watchers (novel), a 1987 novel written by Dean Koontz
 The Watchers (Caiseal Mór), a series of novels from 2002 to 2003 written by Caiseal Mór
 The Watchers: The Rise of America's Surveillance State, a 2010 book by Shane Harris
 The Watcher, a 1986 speculative fiction novel by Jane Palmer

In television
 The Watcher (1995 TV series), a UPN TV series starring Sir Mix-a-Lot
 Watcher (2019 TV series), a South Korean TV series
 The Watcher (2022 TV series), a Netflix original limited series

TV elements 
 "The Watcher", first episode of the 1965 Doctor Who serial The Time Meddler
 Watcher (Doctor Who), a character in the 1981 Doctor Who serial Logopolis
 Watcher (Buffy the Vampire Slayer), a member of the Watcher's Council in the Buffy and Angel television series
 Watcher (Highlander), a secret organization that watches the Immortals in the Highlander series

Film 

 Watchers (1988 film), directed by Jon Hess based on the novel by Koontz
 The Watcher (2000 film), a film directed by Joe Charbanic
 The Watcher (2016 film), an American horror film directed by Ryan Rothmaier
 Watcher (2022 film), Emirati-American-Romanian psychological thriller film directed by Chloe Okuno

In music
 "The Watcher", a song by Enslaved from their 2008 album Vertebrae
 "The Watcher", a song by Hawkwind from their 1972 album Doremi Fasol Latido
 "The//Watcher", a song by Lorna Shore from their 2017 album Flesh Coffin
 "The Watcher" (song), a song by Dr. Dre on his 1999 album The Chronic 2001
 The Watchers (album), a 2001 album by Royal Hunt

Other
 Watcher (presence), a subscriber for presence information
 In the video game, Dark Void the Watchers appear as reptilians or the Annunaki
 Watch (disambiguation)
 Watching (disambiguation)